The men's 200 metre individual medley competition at the 1999 Pan Pacific Swimming Championships took place on August 26–27 at the Sydney International Aquatic Centre.  The last champion was Matthew Dunn of Australia.

This race consisted of four lengths of the pool, one each in backstroke, breaststroke, butterfly and freestyle swimming.

Records
Prior to this competition, the existing world and Pan Pacific records were as follows:

Results
All times are in minutes and seconds.

Heats
The first round was held on August 26.

Semifinals
The semifinals were held on August 26.

Final 
The final was held on August 27.

References

1999 Pan Pacific Swimming Championships